Zlaté Moravce District (Slovak: okres Zlaté Moravce) is a district in the Nitra Region of western Slovakia. Located in lowhills area, the industry is concentrated mostly in district seat town Zlaté Moravce, which is also the largest town in the district and its administrative and cultural center. The district was established in 1923 and in its present borders exists from 1996. Between 1960 and 1966 was the district area part of the Nitra District.

Municipalities

References

Districts of Slovakia
Geography of Nitra Region